Tuxtla F.C. was a football club from Tuxtla Gutiérrez, Mexico that was active from July 2017 to June 2019.

History 
After local team Chiapas F.C. dissolved in July 2017, Jiquipilas Valle Verde F.C. moved from Jiquipilas to Tuxtla Gutiérrez and changed its name to Tuxtla F.C. It played in Serie A, the third tier of the Liga Premier de México in the 2017/18 and 2018/19 seasons. In May 2019, Cafetaleros de Chiapas moved to Tuxtla Gutiérrez and on June 28, 2019, Tuxtla F.C. was dissolved and their entry in the league was taken by a Cafetaleros reserve team.

References

Football clubs in Chiapas
Association football clubs established in 2017
2017 establishments in Mexico